Clevosaurus (meaning "Gloucester lizard") is an extinct genus of rhynchocephalian reptile from the Late Triassic and the Early Jurassic periods. Species of Clevosaurus were widespread across Pangaea, and have been found on all continents except Australia and Antarctica. Five species of Clevosaurus have been found in ancient fissure fill deposits in south-west England and Wales, alongside other sphenodontians, early mammals and dinosaurs. In regards to its Pangaean distribution, C. hadroprodon is the oldest record of a sphenodontian from Gondwana, though its affinity to Clevosaurus has been questioned.

History of discovery 
The first species of Clevosaurus to be described was C. hudsoni, which was described by William Elgin Swinton in 1939 from a fissure fill deposit in Cromhall Quarry (Magnesian Conglomerate Formation) in the county of Gloucestershire, England, with the name of the county lending its name to the genus.

Description 

Clevosaurus was a medium-sized sphenodontian that was estimated to reach full length of ~25 cm (Clevosaurus hudsoni). The skull length could range from as little as 14 mm in C. sectumsemper and up to 40 mm in C. hudsoni. Notable for their greatly reduced number of teeth (3-6 per jaw quadrant), broad skulls and shortened snouts. The teeth of european clevosaurs tended to be mesio-distally elongated, blade-like, and occluded precisely with the opposite pair of teeth, leaving conspicuous diagonal wear facets and acting as a self-sharpening cutting surface. However, the teeth of C. brasiliensis have a very different morphology with no diagonal wear facets, the teeth of the dentary are all conical excluding the posterior-most tooth which can be up to three-times bigger than any of the other teeth, they also have a unique form of implantation, where the base of the teeth sit deeply within the jaw bones, which is not known of in any other rhynchocephalian.

Paleobiology 
Species of Clevosaurus were likely insectivorous. Biomechanical modelling suggests that they had high enough tooth pressures and strong enough bite force to crush chitin, indicating that they had the ability to feed on thick-shelled beetles as well as possibly small vertebrates.

List of species 

 †Clevosaurus bairdi Sues et al. 1994 McCoy Brook Formation, Canada, Hettangian
 †Clevosaurus brasiliensis Bonaparte and Sues 2006 Caturrita Formation, Brazil, Norian
 †Clevosaurus cambrica Keeble et al. 2018 Pant-y-ffynnon Quarry fissure fill, Wales, Rhaetian
 †Clevosaurus convallis Saila 2005 St. Bride's Island fissure fill, Wales, Hettangian
 †Clevosaurus hadroprodon Hsiou et al. 2019 Santa Maria Formation, Brazil, Carnian
 †Clevosaurus hudsoni Swinton 1939 Cromhall Quarry fissure fill, England, Rhaetian
 †Clevosaurus minor Fraser 1988 Cromhall Quarry fissure fill, England, Rhaetian
 †Clevosaurus sectumsemper Klein et al. 2015 Woodleaze Quarry fissure fill, England, Rhaetian
The three species known from the Sinemurian aged Lufeng Formation of China (C. mcgilli, C.wangi and C. petilus) are now considered indeterminate within the genus. Indeterminate remains are also known from the Stormberg Group (either Elliot or Clarens Formation) of South Africa, dating to the Hettangian.

Phylogeny
Below is a cladogram of the relationships within Clevosauridae based on the phylogenetic analysis of Hsiou et al. (2015):

"Clevosaurus" latidens was recovered outside of Clevosauridae, as the sister taxon of Opisthodontia. It was subsequently assigned to a new genus, Fraserosphenodon, in 2018.

References

Additional reading
 Paleofile
 Gill PG, Säilä LK, Corfe IJ, Challands TJ, Williams M, Clemens WA (2006). The fauna and palaeoenvironment of St. Brides Island: Evidence from the lower Jurassic fissure fills of South Wales. In Barrett PM, Evans SE (eds.). Ninth international symposium on Mesozoic terrestrial ecosystems and biota. pp 48−51. London: Natural History Museum.
 Jones MEH (2006) The Early Jurassic clevosaurs from China (Diapsida: Lepidosauria). Natl Mus Nat Hist Sci Bull, 37:548–562.
 Jones MEH (2009). Dentary tooth shape in Sphenodon and its fossil relatives (Diapsida: Lepidosauria: Rhynchocephalia). In Koppe T, Meyer G, Alt KW, (eds). Interdisciplinary Dental Morphology, Frontiers of Oral Biology (vol 13). Greifswald, Germany; Karger. 9–15.

Fossils of China
Fossils of Canada
Triassic lepidosaurs
Jurassic lepidosaurs
Sphenodontia
Late Triassic first appearances
Early Jurassic extinctions
Taxa named by William Elgin Swinton
Prehistoric reptile genera
Paleontology in Nova Scotia